Benjamin Creswick, RBSA (1853–1946) was an English sculptor.

Life

Benjamin Creswick was born in Sheffield, the son of a spectacle-maker. He started his working life as a knife-grinder, but took up sculpture with the encouragement of John Ruskin. In 1887 he modelled a terracotta frieze showing the processes of knife-grinding for the exterior of Cutlers' Hall, in Warwick Lane in the City of London. In the same year he made a frieze for Henry Heath's  shop in Oxford Street, London, showing hat-makers at work.

Creswick worked on various projects with A.H. Mackmurdo, such as the decoration of Pownall Hall in Cheshire, and contributed to the display by Mackmurdo's Century Guild at the Inventions Exhibition in 1885, though he did not join the guild until the following year.

He spent some time in Liverpool and Manchester, before moving to Birmingham, where he was Master of Modelling and Modelled Design at the Birmingham School of Art from 1889 to 1918. He exhibited at the Royal Birmingham Society of Artists in 1914, becoming an associate, and subsequently a member, of the RBSA, and eventually its Professor of Sculpture. He was responsible for a number of architectural sculptures, which can still be seen on Birmingham buildings.

He lived at a house called Elmwood, in Jockey Road, Sutton Coldfield, then in Warwickshire.

His biography was co-written by his great-granddaughter, Annie Creswick Dawson.

Works

Boldmere Swimming Club memorial (1921) – now inside the swimming baths entrance of Wyndley Leisure Centre in Birmingham
Bust of John Ruskin (plaster now in the collection of the Royal Birmingham Society of Artists)
Carved figures on the choirstalls, Wallasey Memorial Unitarian Church, Merseyside
Terracotta frieze on the facade of Cutlers Hall, Warwick Lane, London (1887)
Portrait Roundel of Thomas Carlyle outside Carlyle's House, Cheyne Row, Chelsea
Capitals of Bachelor's Staircase columns at Beaucastle, a house built for George Baker, a former mayor of Birmingham
Carved stone medallion busts of authors, in the Tiled Hall at Leeds Central Library (formerly Municipal Buildings) (1884).

References

Further reading 

 
 The Late Benjamin Creswick. Tribute by Sir Frank Brangwyn, R.A, Birmingham Post, 13 November 1946, in 'Birmingham Biography', vol. 38, pp. 123–124.

External links

The Life and Works of Benjamin Creswick

1853 births
1946 deaths
English sculptors
English male sculptors
Modern sculptors
Academics of Birmingham City University
20th-century British sculptors
19th-century British sculptors
19th-century male artists
Artists from Sheffield
People from Sutton Coldfield
Members and Associates of the Royal Birmingham Society of Artists
Guild of St George